Sphalerostola epierana is a moth in the family Xyloryctidae. It is found in Australia (Queensland).

The wingspan is 17–19 mm for males and 21–24 mm for females.

References

Xyloryctidae
Moths described in 1947